Bring 'Em Back Alive: The Best of Frank Buck is a compilation of excerpts from five of the eight books coauthored by animal collector and multi-platform media personality Frank Buck during his lifetime, as edited by writer and physician Steven Lehrer. 

Buck's books are long out of print and remain copyrighted, and are thus generally inaccessible outside of academic or major municipal libraries. However, Buck's statements are a primary source on the exotic animal trade and development of American zoos in the early 20th century; The Best of Frank Buck has been assigned reading in a university course on the role of zoos in science and culture. Buck is also an important figure in American cultural history, "as renowned in his day as Charles Lindbergh, Admiral Richard E. Byrd, or Babe Ruth." 

The scholarly introduction by Steven Lehrer is valuable source of historiography and biographical information on Buck and his three major coauthors, Edward Anthony, Ferrin Fraser, and Carol Weld. Buck's daughter Barbara Buck granted Lehrer permission to use her father's work and shared some photographs for publication. The hardback edition endpapers are a "Bring 'Em Back Alive" map of Southeast Asia illustrated by Kurt Wiese.

Contents
In addition to the chapters listed below, the book contains a 15-page introduction written by Lehrer, a references section, and an index.

Notes

References

2000 books